Altair: A Record of Battles is an anime television series based on the manga series of the same title written and illustrated by Kotono Katō. The series aired from July 7 to December 22, 2017, on MBS TV's "Animeism" programming block and ran for two cour (two quarters of a year).

For the second half (Episodes 14-24), the opening theme song is "赫色 -akairo-" by three-piece band CIVILIAN and ending theme is "Windy" by R&B duo CHEMISTRY.


Episode list

Notes

References

Altair: A Record of Battles Genesis